"Under These Lights" is a song recorded, written, and produced by Greek DJ Xenia Ghali, featuring vocals by singer/songwriter Ethan Thompson. The track was released on Ghali's personal label Funky Sheep Records. The single also marks a rarity for female DJ/remixers/producers, as it reached number one on Billboard's Dance Club Songs chart in its June 18, 2016 issue.

Background
In an interview with Billboard about the single and its message, Ghali replied, "The song is extremely important to me... I really let go and just focused on what felt right to me. Sonically, I just wanted it to be something that depicted my emotions and passion. Lyrically, I am very proud of what the song stands for. The world is in a very negative place at the moment. There is a lot of hate, anger, racism, discrimination and aggression. "Under These Lights" speaks of the importance of unity and love amongst all of us. It depicts a very optimistic and euphoric message, one which I feel the world is missing right now." Ghali, who did the production work including the drop personally, also used "a synth I built from my own voice" and noted that Thompson's vocal were actually pitched up so she can merged hers with his, but "However, we decided not to include his name in the [credits for] the single because his personal project, which he is very focused on, has a completely different musical vibe than "Under These Lights."

The song's lyrics ("Under these lights, embracing all life/We are lost within these beautiful sights … Let's spread the warmth we've found") were later used in a commentary by Billboard about the 2016 Orlando nightclub shooting and the tragedies involving similar places frequented by the LGBTQ community.

Track listing

References

External links
Official Video at YouTube

2016 songs
2016 singles
Electronic songs
House music songs
Songs against racism and xenophobia
Songs written by Xenia Ghali